Erling Jessen (born 31 August 1938) is a retired Danish sprint canoer who won a bronze medal in the K-1 4×500 m relay at the 1960 Summer Olympics. In 1970–71 he was chairman of the Stoholm IF club.

References

1938 births
Canoeists at the 1960 Summer Olympics
Living people
Olympic canoeists of Denmark
Olympic bronze medalists for Denmark
Olympic medalists in canoeing
Danish male canoeists
Medalists at the 1960 Summer Olympics
People from Kolding
Sportspeople from the Region of Southern Denmark